The Flower of Hawaii is a 1953 West German musical film directed by Géza von Cziffra and starring Maria Litto, Rudolf Platte and Marina Ried. It uses the music of the operetta The Flower of Hawaii by Paul Abraham, but the story was rewritten. Unlike the 1933 film The Flower of Hawaii, this film is not based on the life of the last Queen of Hawaii Liliuokalani. It is part of the tradition of operetta films.

The film's sets were designed by the art director Albrecht Becker and Herbert Kirchhoff. It was shot at the Wandsbek Studios in Hamburg. Location shooting took place in Cannes and Nice.

Cast

References

Bibliography
Traubner, Richard. Operetta: A Theatrical History. Routledge, 2003.

External links

1953 musical comedy films
German musical comedy films
West German films
Films directed by Géza von Cziffra
Films about opera
Films set in Hamburg
Films set in Oceania
Films based on operettas
Remakes of German films
Operetta films
Films scored by Paul Abraham
Films shot in France
Films shot at Wandsbek Studios
German black-and-white films
1950s German films